Andrzej Wach is President of  Polskie Koleje Państwowe S.A. (Polish State Railways). He replaced previous president, Macieja Męclewskiego, in September 2004. He has worked for Polish railways since 1980, and previously held the position of Chairman in PKP Energetyka.

He received an Electrotechnics degree from Politechnika Warszawska (Warsaw University of Technology) and a degree of Law and Administration from Uniwersytet Warszawski (Warsaw University).

References

Polish State Railways people
Warsaw University of Technology alumni
University of Warsaw alumni
Living people
Year of birth missing (living people)